Pearl Tower or Pearl at the Sea is a 70-floor 242 meter (794 foot) skyscraper in Panama City, Panamá. Construction was first planned in 2007. The building was completed in 2012.

See also
 List of tallest buildings in Panama City
 List of tallest buildings in the world

External links

Residential skyscrapers in Panama City
Residential buildings completed in 2012